Marin Sakić (born 8 June 1987 in Rijeka) is a Croatian handballer, who plays in line player position for Váci KSE.

Sakić started in his career in his hometown club RK Zamet. He played for Zamet from 2005 to 2013.

From 2013 to 2017 Sakić played for NEXE Našice.

Results

RK Zamet II
3. HRL - West
Winner (1): 2004-05

RK Zamet
Croatian Cup
Finalist (1): 2012

RK NEXE Našice
Dukat Premier League
Runner-up (4): 2013-14, 2014-15, 2015-16, 2016-17
Croatian Cup
Finalist (3): 2012, 2015, 2017
Third place (1): 2016

References

External links
 Marin Sakić in European competitions
 Marin Sakić SEHA League stats
 Marin Sakić Premier League and SEHA League stats

1987 births
Living people
Croatian male handball players
Handball players from Rijeka
RK Zamet players